Marcela Hilgertová (née Košťálová, born 1962) is a former Czechoslovak slalom canoeist who competed from the early 1980s to the early 1990s. She won two bronze medals in the K-1 team event at the ICF Canoe Slalom World Championships, earning them in 1983 and 1989.

Family 
Her husband Ivan Hilgert is also a former slalom canoeist and medalist from world championships, their daughter is Czech canoeist Amálie Hilgertová.

References

External links 
 Marcela HILGERTOVA at CanoeSlalom.net

Czechoslovak female canoeists
Living people
1962 births
Medalists at the ICF Canoe Slalom World Championships